Rea Mauranen (born 25 April 1949 in Helsinki, Finland) is a Finnish television actress who has appeared in several Finnish films.

Mauranen made her debut on TV in 1974, and has worked consistently ever since mostly appearing on Finnish television. In film, she worked with director Timo Koivusalo in the 2003 film Sibelius alongside actors such as Martti Suosalo, Heikki Nousiainen, Seela Sella, Miina Turunen, Vesa Vierikko, Raimo Grönberg and Jarmo Mäkinen.

Though not having children of her own, Rea said, bitterness is useless.

Selected filmography
 The Collector (1997)
 The Renovation (2020)

External links

References 

1949 births
Living people
Actresses from Helsinki
Finnish film actresses
Finnish television actresses